Carl Van Loan (born 20 August 1980) is an American former Nordic combined skier who competed in the 2006 Winter Olympics.

References

1980 births
Living people
American male Nordic combined skiers
Olympic Nordic combined skiers of the United States
Nordic combined skiers at the 2006 Winter Olympics